Óskar Hrafn Þorvaldsson (born 25 October 1973) is an Icelandic former footballer and the manager of Breiðablik. He started his manager career with Grótta in the third tier of Icelandic football in 2018, placing second and getting promoted. In the 2019 second tier season he guided Grótta to first place in the league and promotion to the top tier. After the season he was hired by Breiðablik, with Grótta hiring Ágúst Gylfason who had just vacated the manager role at Breiðablik. In 2019 Óskar Hrafn was voted the coach of the year in Icelandic sports as the Icelandic Sportsperson of the Year was announced. He won three caps for the Iceland national football team.

Playing career
After playing the majority of his career with Knattspyrnufélag Reykjavíkur, Óskar finished his career with Strømsgodset in the Norwegian Tippeligaen. He retired in 1999, at the age of 25, due to a back injury.

Titles
Icelandic Cup (2): 1994, 1995
Icelandic Super Cup: 1996

Journalist career
Óskar worked as a journalist for several years and was a news editor for Vísir.is, Dagblaðið Vísir and Stöð 2, where he was the head of Stöð 2 Sport.

Personal life
His son is footballer Orri Óskarsson. When Óskar managed Grótta in 2018, Óskar gave Orri his senior debut 11 days before Orri's 14th birthday.

References

External links

1973 births
Living people
Oskar Thorvaldsson
Oskar Thorvaldsson
Oskar Thorvaldsson
Oskar Thorvaldsson
Association football defenders
Oskar Thorvaldsson
Strømsgodset Toppfotball players
Eliteserien players
Oskar Thorvaldsson
Expatriate footballers in Norway
Oskar Thorvaldsson
Oskar Thorvaldsson